Studio Fredman is a well-known recording studio in Gothenburg, Sweden, owned and operated by producer Fredrik Nordström.

It is popular among Swedish metal bands, with artists such as At the Gates, Deathstars, Nightrage, Norwegian band Dimmu Borgir, Arch Enemy, Soilwork, Dark Tranquillity, In Flames, Zonaria, Machinae Supremacy, HammerFall, England's Bring Me the Horizon, A Breach of Silence, and Opeth recording multiple releases in the studio.

Originally, it was located in Gothenburg, but by 2005, it was relocated to Hyssna about 30 miles outside Gothenburg.

The original facility was also co-owned by In Flames vocalist, Anders Fridén. By the time of relocation, the original studio became In Flames-owned IF Studios.

In 2008, Studio Fredman relocated once again in downtown Gothenburg at Västra Frölunda/Högsbo.

Albums recorded

1994 
At the Gates – Terminal Spirit Disease
In Flames – Lunar Strain
In Flames – Subterranean
Luciferion – Demonication (The Manifest)
Nifelheim – Nifelheim

1995 
Ceremonial Oath – Carpet
Memory Garden – Forever
At the Gates – Slaughter of the Soul
Crystal Age – Far Beyond Divine Horizons
Dark Tranquillity – The Gallery

1996 
Memory Garden – Tides
Arch Enemy – Black Earth
In Flames – The Jester Race
Sacrilege – Lost in the Beauty You Slay
Dark Tranquillity – Enter Suicidal Angels

1997 
Dark Tranquillity – The Mind's I
In Flames – Whoracle

1998 
Arch Enemy – Stigmata
Opeth – My Arms, Your Hearse
Soilwork – Steelbath Suicide

1999 
Arch Enemy – Burning Bridges
Dark Tranquillity – Projector
In Flames – Colony
Opeth – Still Life

2000 
In Flames – Clayman
Soilwork – The Chainheart Machine

2001 
Dimmu Borgir – Puritanical Euphoric Misanthropia
Opeth – Blackwater Park
Soilwork – A Predator's Portrait

2002 
Opeth – Deliverance
Soilwork – Natural Born Chaos
Buried Dreams (Mex) – Necrosphere

2003 
Opeth – Damnation
Darkest Hour – Hidden Hands of a Sadist Nation

2006 
I Killed the Prom Queen – Music for the Recently Deceased

2007 
Anthelion – Bloodshed Rebefallen

2008 
Bring Me the Horizon – Suicide Season
Firewind – The Premonition

2009 
Old Man's Child – Slaves of the World

2010 
Bring Me the Horizon – There Is a Hell...

2014 
I Killed the Prom Queen – Beloved
Architects – Lost Forever // Lost Together
Decadawn – Solitary Confinement

2016 
Follow My Lead – Spit, Kick, Revolt.
Architects – All Our Gods Have Abandoned Us

External links 
 Official website

Music in Gothenburg
Recording studios in Sweden
Albums recorded at Studio Fredman